Yakuza Graveyard, known in Japan as , is a 1976 Japanese yakuza film directed by Kinji Fukasaku. The screenplay by Kazuo Kasahara is based on a concept by Norimichi Matsudaira, Naoyuki Sugimoto and Kyo Namura.

Complex named it number 17 on their list of The 25 Best Yakuza Movies. Kino International released the film on DVD in North America in 2006.

Plot
Kuroiwa, a police investigator born in Manchukuo, is cracking down on yakuza business but his rough methods often get him in trouble with his superiors and he is transferred to a new beat in Osaka. Kuroiwa is sleeping with the widow of a man he killed and she demands that he give her enough money to open up her own bar. When Kuroiwa humiliates and beats a group of young yakuza from the Nishida family, the Nishida family offers him money to be on their side in a turf war against the Yamashiro family, but he refuses. The Nishida family tells underboss Matsunaga's half-Korean wife Keiko to convince Kuroiwa to take their side. Meanwhile, Kuroiwa pressures the young yakuza members he had beaten into helping him arrest other criminals. He visits a gambling house to try to win the money he needs for his girlfriend and one of the young Nishida yakuza sees a Yamashiro yakuza in illegal possession of a weapon and follows him to tell Kuroiwa where he went. Kuroiwa arrives and discovers a group of former police officers now working with the Yamashiro family under the leadership of Police Vice President Teramitsu. Teramitsu offers him money but Kuroiwa burns it in disgust. Kanai of the Yamashiro family confronts the Nishida yakuza about planting a cop in their gambling house and a shootout erupts.

Keiko gives Kuroiwa the money he needs for his girlfriend and asks him to accompany her to Tottori, where her husband is imprisoned on a 75-year sentence. When she suggests to him that Ezaki should become the leader, he erupts in anger and tells her that she should have hung herself when he was condemned. Distraught, she attempts to throw herself into the ocean but is saved by Kuroiwa. The police make plans to gather dirt on the Nishida bosses in order to take down the family, but when Kuroiwa suggests going after the Yamashiro family as well they tell him to follow orders. Lieutenant Hidaka, Kuroiwa's old friend from the police academy, is assigned to the Nishida task force and tells Kuroiwa that Internal Affairs and his boss know that he is sleeping with the widow of the man he killed. The widow uses the money from Kuroiwa as a partial down payment on a bar.

Kuroiwa is invited to a pledge of brotherhood ceremony between the Yushin group and the Nishida family, where Iwata Goro is announced as new acting boss of the family on behalf of the boss Sugi. When Iwata stops Kuroiwa from touching Keiko, a large brawl erupts. Iwata later visits Kuroiwa with alcohol and foreign prostitutes and asks for his help with a gambler who ran out on a 30-million-yen debt. Kuroiwa learns that the debtor was forced to sell his Quonset huts to the Crime Prevention Association, which had signed a contract for 50 million, but one of the patrons was Kusumoto, a Yamashiro man who forcibly took 30 million as a fee to settle the debt with the Nishida family but never brought the money to Iwata. Kuroiwa also finds that the association is run by Sanko enterprises, a legit front for the Yamashiro family, so he suggests that Chief Akama could investigate Kusumoto to squeeze him on charges of extortion or fraud and get him to return the huts so that the debtor could sell them and get the money to pay Iwata. Iwata apologizes for the fight and says he will tell Matsunaga to divorce Keiko. Iwata confesses that he is full-blooded Korean and the two pledge brotherhood. Kusumoto is brought in and beaten for information, but Kuroiwa is relieved of duty and brought up on charges of soliciting foreign prostitutes, blackmailing the owner of a mahjong parlor under the name of the Nishida family, and using the Sanno police to drag a suspect into custody. They also accuse him of pledging brotherhood with a yakuza and sleeping with the mistress of the yakuza he killed.

A series of violent attacks are exchanged between the two families and eventually the riot police are called in to guard the leaders and headquarters of each organization and set up roadblocks. Hidaka tails Kuroiwa and finds where Iwata is hiding while recovering from a bullet wound in his leg, but Kuroiwa beats him to prevent him from calling in to the station. The police threaten Sugi with charges for instigating a riot but he makes a deal and agrees to make peace with the Yamashiro family once the Acting Boss Iwata is taken out. Kuroiwa taps Teramitsu's phone and overhears details about the deal but he is discovered and injected with what they call a truth serum used by the nazis and he tells them the location of Iwata's hideout. The police arrest Iwata and set him up with an easy escape opportunity to enable them to kill him and claim that it was due to falling during the escape. Sugi tells his men not to fight the Yamashiro family anymore and kicks out a remorseful Kuroiwa. Keiko injects him with heroin to make him settle down, then points a gun at him and accuses him of betraying her and Iwata but the bullet only hits him in the arm. She shoots up the rest of the heroin herself, explaining that she started shooting up when she was a 13-year-old hooker and that she does not belong to anyone. Kuroiwa claims her as his own and insists that he never betrayed her. To prove it, he marches into the police station and interrupts a meeting between the police and the Nishida family, which is agreeing to voluntarily disband, and tells Hidaka to arrest Teramitsu and the chief. They dismiss him as a drug addict so he shoots and kills Teramitsu. As Kuroiwa is walking toward Keiko's car, Hidaka runs out and shoots him dead.

Cast

Tetsuya Watari as Kuroiwa Ryu
Meiko Kaji as Matsunaga Keiko
Tatsuo Umemiya as Iwata Goro
Hideo Murota as Hidaka
Nobuo Kaneko as Akama
Harumi Sone as Kanai Katsugi
Takuzo Kawatani as Kajiyama
Jirō Yabuki as Wakamoto Hideo
Jūkei Fujioka as Kojima
Yoshio Yoshida as Yamashiro Takashi
Kin Sugai as Wakamoto Kimiyo
Takao Yagi as Arai Hatsue
Mikio Narita as Nozaki
Junkichi Orimoto as Hatano Takechi
Nagisa Oshima as Muramoto
Kei Satō as Teramitsu Abara
Takuya Fujioka as Sugi Masaki
Kenji Imai as Matsunaga Shunji
Nenji Kobayashi as Kitajima Akira
Yasuo Matsumoto as Konichi Masao
Kenta Mayumi as Fujioka Osamu
Satoshi Nahen as Ikuma
Mineko Maruhira as Sugimika
Masaharu Arikawa as Ezaki Toshio
Nobuo Yana as Ezaki Nobuhisa
Hideo Shimada as Okawara Yoshiichi
Teruo Fujinaga as Ueshima Takashi
Shimoyama Takaya as Mizutani
Tetsuo Ashida as Nishio
Chisao Miyagi as Koike
Kojiro Shirakawa as Asai
Kuniomi Kitani as Okutani Isamu
Takashi Shirai as Miyazaki
Shigeru Inoue as Okamoto
Katsutoshi Akiyama as Takeuchi Kiyoshi
Yasuhiro Suzuki as Kenkichi
Masataka Iwao as Kusumoto Masaharu
Toshiyuki Sasaki as Miyake Noburo
Shotaro Hayashi as Kito
Toshio Tomogane as Hirokoshi
Kazuo Kasahara as Kizu
Masami Kodaka as Bito
Takashi Ienoshima as Arai Shinkichi
Kinji Nakamura as Shinzaki Bunpei

References

External links
 
 Review of the film
 Vista Records Review of the film

1970s police films
1976 films
Films directed by Kinji Fukasaku
Films set in Osaka
Films set in Tottori Prefecture
Yakuza films
1970s Japanese films